RC Rivne is a Ukrainian rugby club in Rivne.

History
The club was founded in 1999.

Players

Current squad

External links
 RC Rivne

Rugby clubs established in 1999
Ukrainian rugby union teams
Sport in Rivne
1999 establishments in Ukraine